Great Wyrley Academy (formerly Great Wyrley High School) is a co-educational secondary school and sixth form located in Great Wyrley in the English county of Staffordshire.

Great Wyrley Academy is located at the extreme south of the Staffordshire border with the Metropolitan Borough of Walsall in the West Midlands, and therefore the school educates pupils from both areas. It has played a major role in the village for many years and are known for their music and performance events throughout the year.

Previously a community school administered by Staffordshire County Council, Great Wyrley High School converted to academy status in September 2018 and was renamed Great Wyrley Academy. The school is now sponsored by the Windsor Academy Trust.

Academics
Great Wyrley Academy offers GCSEs and BTECs as programmes of study for pupils. Students can also study vocational courses at South Staffordshire College as part of their GCSE timetable.

Sixth Form is run as a collegiate with Cheslyn Hay Academy. Students in the sixth form have the option to study from a range of A-levels and further BTECs.

Facilities
The school has facilities including 35+ classrooms, 8 science laboratories, 6 computer rooms, 2 design and technology workshops, creative art suites, a 300-seat theatre, a sports gym, a sixth form centre and a swimming pool.

Headteachers
 Mr A Sweet (1967 - 1985)
 Mr J Large (1985 - 2004)
 Mr C Leach (2004 - 2015)
 Mrs N Crookshank (Interim 2015 - 2017)
 Mr L Taylor (2017 - 2018)
 Mr I Moreton (2018–Present)

Notable former pupils
Michael Foster, former Labour Party politician.
Melody Hossaini, entrepreneur & BBC's The Apprentice star.
Andrew Tift, Realist portrait artist exhibited Nationally and at the Walsall New Art Gallery.

References

External links
 

Secondary schools in Staffordshire
Great Wyrley
Academies in Staffordshire